Clayton is a city in Custer County, Idaho, United States. The population was 7 at the 2010 census, down from 27 in 2000. It is adjacent to the Salmon River.

History 
Clayton was founded in 1881 as a smelter site for the nearby mines.

Geography

Climate
This climatic region is typified by large seasonal temperature differences, with warm to hot (and often humid) summers and cold (sometimes severely cold) winters.  According to the Köppen Climate Classification system, Clayton has a humid continental climate, abbreviated "Dfb" on climate maps.

Highway
 - Salmon River Scenic Byway

Clayton is located on State Highway 75, between Stanley (west) and Challis (northeast).

Demographics

2010 census
As of the census of 2010, there were 7 people, 4 households, and 2 families residing in the city. The racial makeup of the city was 100.0% White.

There were 4 households, of which 25.0% had children under the age of 18 living with them, 50.0% were married couples living together, and 50.0% were non-families. 50.0% of all households were made up of individuals, and 25% had someone living alone who was 65 years of age or older. The average household size was 1.75 and the average family size was 2.50.

The median age in the city was 57.5 years. 14.3% of residents were under the age of 18; 0% were between the ages of 18 and 24; 28.6% were from 25 to 44; 14.3% were from 45 to 64; and 42.9% were 65 years of age or older. The gender makeup of the city was 57.1% male and 42.9% female.

2000 census
As of the census of 2000, there were 27 people, 12 households, and 6 families residing in the city. The racial makeup of the city was 100.00% White.

There were 12 households, out of which 16.7% had children under the age of 18 living with them, 50.0% were married couples living together, and 50.0% were non-families. 33.3% of all households were made up of individuals, and 8.3% had someone living alone who was 65 years of age or older. The average household size was 2.25 and the average family size was 3.17.

In the city, the population was spread out, with 25.9% under the age of 18, 3.7% from 18 to 24, 7.4% from 25 to 44, 51.9% from 45 to 64, and 11.1% who were 65 years of age or older. The median age was 48 years. For every 100 females, there were 80.0 males. For every 100 females age 18 and over, there were 66.7 males.

The median income for a household in the city was $50,625, and the median income for a family was $30,625. Males had a median income of $21,875 versus $28,750 for females. The per capita income for the city was $11,996. There were no families and 15.8% of the population living below the poverty line, including no under eighteens and none of those over 64.

References

External links
 Community website

Cities in Idaho
Cities in Custer County, Idaho